Octavio Hernández was the Vice Chairman of the Board, President, and Chief Executive Officer of U.S. Century Bank. Mr. Hernández is also one of U.S. Century Bank's founders.
Later, sometime in the 2010’s he became a algebra teacher, at Citrus Ridge: A Civics Academy.

References

Living people
American bankers
Year of birth missing (living people)
American chief executives of financial services companies